Chondrohierax is a genus of  birds of prey in the family Accipitridae. Its two members, the hook-billed kite (C. uncinatus) and the Cuban kite (C. wilsonii), are often considered to be conspecific. The hook-billed kite is widespread in the warmer parts of the Americas, while the Cuban kite is a critically endangered Cuban endemic.

See also
 
 BirdLife Species Factsheet

 
Bird genera
Taxa named by René Lesson